Robert Moore (born in Hamilton, Ontario) is a Canadian poet, actor, director, playwright, and professor. He has written over a dozen plays that have been performed across Canada, and he has published five books of poetry.  So Rarely in Our Skins was a finalist for the 6th Annual Atlantic Poetry Prize, the Margaret and John Savage First Book Award and, along with his two subsequent books, was long-listed for the ReLit Award in Poetry. Moore's poetry has been published in literary journals such as Descant, The Fiddlehead, Wascana Review, Ink Magazine, Canadian Author, The New Quarterly, Maissoneuve, Pottersfield Portfolio, Gaspereau Review, Prairie Fire, Quadrant Magazine, and Contemporary Verse II. He has been the recipient of the Edmonton Journal Literary Award for poetry (1987) as well as a finalist for the Pottersfield Portfolio Short Poetry Award (1997), The Writers’ Federation of New Brunswick Alfred G. Bailey Prize (2001) and The New Brunswick Literary Award for Poetry (2016).

Bibliography

 So Rarely in Our Skins, The Muse's Company, 2002
Museum Absconditum, Wolsak & Wynn, 2006
 Figuring Ground, Wolsak & Wynn, 2009 
 The Golden Book of Bovinities, Signal Editions, 2012
 'Based on Actual Events,' Signal Editions, 2016.

References

External links
Robert Moore (archived January 2013)

21st-century Canadian poets
21st-century Canadian dramatists and playwrights
Writers from Hamilton, Ontario
Living people
Canadian male poets
Canadian male dramatists and playwrights
21st-century Canadian male writers
Year of birth missing (living people)